This is a list of medical schools in Rwanda.

See also
 List of universities in Rwanda
 Education in Rwanda

References

 01
Rwanda
Medical schools